eButterfly is a real-time, online database and photo storage program. It provides a way for the butterfly community to report, organize, and access information about butterflies in Central and North America and the Caribbean. eButterfly provides detailed sources for basic data on butterfly abundance,  distribution, and phenology at a variety of spatial and temporal scales across the region. eButterfly is maximizing the utility and accessibility of the vast numbers of butterfly observations, photographs, and collections made each year by recreational and professional butterfly enthusiasts. Observations can be entered directly to the eButterfly website. , eButterfly users have contributed over 429,000 observations.

History
From a graduate school student’s lofty dream a decade ago to a full-fledged citizen science program today, eButterfly has come a long way.  You might even say that eButterfly actually took flight over 60 years ago when Jacques Larivée started Études des Populations d’Oiseaux du Québec bird checklist program. Now with over 10 million records, it’s the longest-running bird checklist program in North America. The daily checklists have provided incredibly reliable information on changes in bird populations, phenology, and geographic and climate abundance patterns at local, regional, and continental scales. His son Max Larrivée grew up checklisting in eastern Québec. It wasn’t birds that caught his eye, but rather butterflies.

“Because of my dad, I swam in butterfly and bird checklists since I was five years old,” said Larrivée. “I first thought of building a checklist-based butterfly website in 2000 when I entered graduate school.”

But it wasn’t until he joined the Canadian Facility for Ecoinformatics Research, led by Jeremy Kerr at the University of Ottawa, that he was able to act on his idea. They wanted to unify all of Canada’s butterfly record data into a single database and continue to survey across the country. And the only way they could do that on a meager budget was to unite a lot of professional lepidopterists and amateur butterfly watchers together.

“In 2010 I pinned two college computer science teams against one another to build a beta version of eButterfly,” said Larrivée. “ And that is how I met Xinbao Zhang who turned out to be a real wizard of a programmer for this sort of thing and we’ve been working together ever since.”

After two years of fine-tuning the system, with great support from local butterfly experts Peter Hall, Ross Layberry, Jeff Skevington, Rick Cavasin and the Ottawa area butterfly group, they launched a modest Canadian eButterfly program in 2012. The site was a success in Canada, but they knew they could make it even better if they expand it across the remainder of North America to increase its scope and research potential of the data gathered by the project.

Katy Prudic, a scientist at the University of Arizona, was thinking the same thing. “Butterflies, an important part of many ecosystems, are extremely sensitive to changes in temperature, population growth, urban sprawl, land and water use, and many other forces”, Prudic said. “Experts have the ability with powerful computers to interpret these changes and better understand how they are affecting biodiversity – but they don’t have the manpower to gather all the data”. She quickly joined the eButterfly team and helped them expand across North America.

With eButterfly’s popularity rising rapidly, they were poised to evolve the site even further. Kent McFarland, a long-time butterfly watcher and director of the Vermont Butterfly Survey at the Vermont Center for Ecostudies, had been managing the first eBird state portal for over a decade. “I started using eButterfly right away when I discovered it and I realized it had the potential to be as big and powerful as eBird one day,” said McFarland.

He joined the team and they all soon traveled to the home of eBird at the Cornell Lab of Ornithology where Team eBird offered to give technical advice for a few days. “The folks at eBird were incredible,” said Larrivée. “They really encouraged us to keep going and were incredibly helpful in advising us on all aspects of this. It really allowed us to leap forward quickly.” Armed with a better understanding of the underpinnings of eBird, the team worked through the fall and winter racing to get the new and improved eButterfly ready by spring.

Like eBird, eButterfly is a source of standardized georeferenced presence/presumed absence data, not just single observation presence-only data. Single observation presence-only data, which includes most citizen science outside of eBird and eButterfly along with data from natural history specimen collections, while valuable is of limited information beyond phenology and broadly defined species distribution for example. These models play a critical role in conservation decision-making and ecological or biogeographical inference, but can lead to suboptimal conservation outcomes. eButterfly data collection protocols offer more and better refined modeling outcomes for conservation and ecology. Building models with suitable data maximizes these rare and valuable resources and delivers outputs that better inform conservation, management decisions and move scientific research forward.

Participation
Members of the eButterfly community enter butterfly sightings as part of regular surveys, organized butterfly counts or as incidental observations.  There are checklists for each state and province, and entries can be made with or without photos.

Team 

Maxim Larrivée, PhD, Founder & Director of eButterfly. Max is the director of the Insectarium Montréal. His research explores how global change impacts the distribution of butterflies. He has strong interests in biodiversity information management and macroecology of insects.

Kent McFarland, MS, Co-director of eButterfly. Kent is a senior conservation biologist at the Vermont Center for Ecostudies in Norwich, Vermont. His research focuses on bird and butterfly ecology and conservation. He has wide-ranging experiences and interests with community science, communications and conservation photography.

Kathleen Prudic, PhD, Co-director of eButterfly. Katy’s research aims to discover how ecological interactions have shaped the form, function, and distribution of butterflies. She has strong interests in plant-insect interactions, community ecology, and explaining why butterflies, of all insects, have complex and diverse wing patterns.

Rodrigo Solis, DVM, PhD candidate, eButterfly Human Network and Data Coordinator. Rodrigo is a Resource and Environmental Management PhD Candidate at Simon Fraser University, Canada. His main research interest lies within the social-ecological interphase of the Monarch Butterfly conservation. He has been working with the Monarch for 8 years now and collaborated with several organizations such as WWF-Mexico. He Joined the eButterfly team in 2019 as the Human Network and Data Coordinator, after doing an 6-month internship at the Montreal Insectarium.

Xinbao Zhang, Programmer of eButterfly. Xinbao is a computer scientist interested in bioinformatics, database creation and citizen science. He translates our eButterfly ideas and wants into reality. He’s nothing short of a wizard. When not busy coding, we hope he practices swinging a net.

Jeremy Kerr, PhD, Founder of eButterfly and Principal Investigator. Jeremy is Professor of Biology at the University of Ottawa. His intellectual contributions and research support were instrumental to the original development of eButterfly, which is part of his Canada Global Change Transect (CGCT) project. He is Vice President (and President-elect) of the Canadian Society for Ecology and Evolution, holds the University Research Chair in Macroecology and Conservation, and is both a Science Leadership Fellow and inaugural fellow of the Global Young Academy.

Research based on eButterfly observations
A 2018 study of over 100,000 Canadian butterfly observations submitted to eButterfly noted that 5 species of butterfly that were new to Canada were reported via eButterfly.  The authors also noted that by combining amateur data from eButterfly with traditional research data, the result was an improved understanding of butterfly distribution and density in Canada.

 Wilson J. Keaton, Casajus Nicolas, Hutchinson Rebecca A., McFarland Kent P., Kerr Jeremy T., Berteaux Dominique, Larrivée Maxim, Prudic Kathleen L. 2021. Climate Change and Local Host Availability Drive the Northern Range Boundary in the Rapid Expansion of a Specialist Insect Herbivore, Papilio cresphontes. Frontiers in Ecology and Evolution 9:85. https://doi.org/10.3389/fevo.2021.579230
 Skreta, M., Luccioni, A., & Rolnick, D. (2020). Spatiotemporal Features Improve Fine-Grained Butterfly Image Classification. Tackling Climate Change with Machine Learning workshop at NeurIPS 2020. https://www.climatechange.ai/papers/neurips2020/63/paper.pdf
 Tremblay, P., MacMillan, H. A., & Kharouba, H. M. (2020). Autumn larval cold tolerance does not predict the northern range limit of a widespread butterfly species. bioRxiv. https://doi.org/10.1101/2020.06.14.151266
 Weiser, E. L., Diffendorfer, J. E., Lopez-Hoffman, L., Semmens, D., & Thogmartin, W. E. (2020). Challenges for leveraging citizen science to support statistically robust monitoring programs. Biological Conservation, 242, 108411. https://doi.org/10.1016/j.biocon.2020.108411
 Crewe, Tara L., Mitchell, Greg W., Larrivée, Maxim. (2019). Size of the Canadian Breeding Population of Monarch Butterflies Is Driven by Factors Acting During Spring Migration and Recolonization. Frontiers in Ecology and Evolution 7: 308. https://doi.org/10.3389/fevo.2019.00308
 Weiser, E. L., Diffendorfer, J. E., Grundel, R., López‐Hoffman, L., Pecoraro, S., Semmens, D., & Thogmartin, W. E. (2019). Balancing sampling intensity against spatial coverage for a community science monitoring programme. Journal of Applied Ecology. https://doi.org/10.1111/1365-2664.13491
 Wilson, J. Keaton, Nicolas Casajus, Rebecca A. Hutchinson, Kent P. McFarland, Jeremy T. Kerr, Dominique Berteaux, Maxim Larrivée, Kathleen L. Prudic (2019) Climate change and local host availability drive the northern range boundary in the rapid northward expansion of the eastern giant swallowtail butterfly bioRxiv 868125; doi: https://doi.org/10.1101/868125
 Soroye, P., Ahmed, N., Kerr, J.T. (2018). Opportunistic citizen science data transform understanding of species distributions, phenology, and diversity gradients for global change research. Global Change Biology 24, 5281–5291. https://doi.org/10.1111/gcb.14358
 Prudic, K. L., Oliver, J. C., Brown, B. V., & Long, E. C. (2018). Comparisons of citizen science data-gathering approaches to evaluate urban butterfly diversity. Insects, 9(4), 186.
 Prudic, K. L., McFarland, K. P., Oliver, J. C., Hutchinson, R. A., Long, E. C., Kerr, J. T., & Larrivée, M. (2017). eButterfly: leveraging massive online citizen science for butterfly conservation. Insects, 8(2), 53. https://doi.org/10.3390/insects8020053
 Ries, L., & Oberhauser, K. (2015). A citizen army for science: quantifying the contributions of citizen scientists to our understanding of monarch butterfly biology. BioScience, 65(4), 419-430. https://doi.org/10.1093/biosci/biv011

See also
 Butterfly count
 List of citizen science projects

References

External links
 
 The North American Butterfly Monitoring Network

Biology websites
Citizen science
Internet properties established in 2011
Entomological databases